Cassandra is a prophetess in Greek mythology who was blessed with foresight but cursed, never to be believed.

Cassandra may also refer to:

Arts and entertainment
Cassandra (novel), a 1984 novel by Christa Wolf
"Cassandra" (short story), a 1978 short story by C. J. Cherryh
Cassandra (album), a 1997 album by Zoar
"Cassandra" (Theatre of Tragedy song), 1998
"Cassandra" (ABBA song), 1982
"Cassandra" (Red Dwarf), an episode of the television series Red Dwarf
Cassandra (film), a 1987 Australian horror film
Cassandra: Warrior Angel, a Filipino television series
Cassandra (Two Steps From Hell song), 2014
 "Cassandra" (Sherbet song), 1973

People and fictional characters
 Cassandra (name), a given name (including a list of persons and characters with that name)
 João Paulo Cassandra (born 1961), São Toméan politician
 José Cassandra (born 1964), São Toméan politician
 William Connor or Cassandra (1909–1967), British journalist

Places
 Cassandra, Georgia, an unincorporated community
 Cassandra, Pennsylvania, a borough in United States
 Cassandreia, Greece, sometimes spelled "Cassandra"

Other uses
 , various Royal Navy ships
 Cassandra (metaphor), a term used in situations in which valid warnings or concerns are dismissed or disbelieved
 Apache Cassandra, a NoSQL database management system previously developed by Facebook
 Project Cassandra, a stymied DEA-led effort to undercut Hezbollah funding from illicit drug sources

See also
 
 , including people with the first name Cassandra
 Cassandre (artist) (1901–1968), pseudonym of the French graphic designer Adolphe Jean Marie Mouron
 Kassandra (disambiguation)
 Cassie (disambiguation)